Marco Polo Fest is a Croatian pop music and wine 2-day festival held on the island of Korčula since 1996. The festival was organised to celebrate and honor the 700th anniversary of the merchant traveler Marco Polo.

Grand Prix winners
1996 - Carlo Pedron with "Afrodita Korčula"
1997 - Vinko Coce with "Kad me nikad neće"
1998 - Vinko Coce with "Žmul vina"
1999 - Alen Vitasović with "Nisam bio za tebe"
2000 - Tereza Kesovija with "Sastala se stara klapa"
2001 - Đuka Čaić with "Evo rode"
2002 - Neno Belan and Fiumensi with "Ka'vanna"
2003 - Saša Lendero and Miha Hercog with "Sunce izlazi" 
2004 - Alen Vitasović with "Ja dat ću sve"
2005 - Dražen Žanko with "Ljetna je noć"
2006 - Ivan Šegedin and Tin Ujević with "Rodi majko zemlji sina"
2007 - Yang Xiaoguang with "Nek je sretna China i Croatia"

See also
 Croatian music festivals

References

External links

Korčula
Music festivals in Croatia
1996 establishments in Croatia
Music festivals established in 1996